This article lists events that occurred during 1934 in Estonia.

Incumbents
Prime Minister – Konstantin Päts

Events
24 January – new constitution in effect.
12 March – Konstantin Päts with the help of General Johan Laidoner set up a virtual dictatorship. Parliament was prorogued and political parties were banned. Many members of the Vaps Movement were arrested.

Births
22 April – Ene-Margit Tiit, Estonian statistician

Deaths

References

 
1930s in Estonia
Estonia
Estonia
Years of the 20th century in Estonia